Migbelis Lynette Castellanos Romero (born June 7, 1995) is a Venezuelan actress, TV host, model, and beauty queen. She represented the Costa Oriental region of the state of Zulia at the Miss Venezuela 2013 pageant. She represented Venezuela, and eventually became a top 10 finalist at Miss Universe 2014. She was also crowned as Nuestra Belleza Latina 2018.

Early life
Migbelis attends the Universidad Rafael Belloso Chacín, in Maracaibo, where she was pursuing two BAs, one in Social Communication and another one in Political Science in the Universidad del Zulia (LUZ-Maracaibo).

Pageantry

Miss Teen Costa Oriental
In 2010, Migbelis won the title Miss Teen Costa Oriental 2010

Miss Venezuela 2013
On October 10, 2013, Migbelis participated in and was crowned as Miss Venezuela 2013.

Miss Universe 2014
Migbelis represented Venezuela at Miss Universe 2014, which was held on Sunday, January 25, 2015, at Florida International University in Doral, Miami, Florida and she placed in the Top 10, finishing 10th overall.

Nuestra Belleza Latina 2018
In 2018, Migbelis competed on the Univision show Nuestra Belleza Latina. On December 2, 2018, Castellanos was crowned the winner, becoming the first Venezuelan and South American to win the competition. As her prize for winning the pageant, Castellanos gets a one-year contract with Univision. Also, she gets $100,000 from winning the pageant.

References

External links

Miss Venezuela Official Website
Miss Venezuela La Nueva Era MB

1995 births
Miss Universe 2014 contestants
Living people
Venezuelan beauty pageant winners
Venezuelan female models
People from Cabimas
University of Zulia alumni